Tika Simone, also sometimes credited as TiKA, is a Canadian rhythm and blues singer. She is noted as a winner of the Canadian Screen Award for Best Original Song, at the 10th Canadian Screen Awards in 2022 for "And Then We Don't", a song she co-wrote with Casey Manierka-Quaile for Thyrone Tommy's film Learn to Swim.

A prominent performer on Toronto's live music scene since the 2010s, she released her full-length debut album, Anywhere But Here, in 2021.

References

21st-century Canadian women singers
21st-century Black Canadian women singers
Canadian rhythm and blues singers
Canadian songwriters
Canadian LGBT singers
Queer musicians
Black Canadian LGBT people
Musicians from Toronto
Living people
Year of birth missing (living people)
Best Original Song Genie and Canadian Screen Award winners
21st-century Canadian LGBT people